is a Japanese ice hockey player and member of the Japanese national team, currently playing with the Seibu Princess Rabbits of the Women's Japan Ice Hockey League (WJIHL) and All-Japan Women's Ice Hockey Championship. 

She represented Japan at the IIHF Women's World Championships in 2019 and 2021.

Her sister, Shiori Yamashita, also plays for the Japanese national team.

References

External links
 
 

2000 births
Living people
Japanese women's ice hockey forwards
Ice hockey players at the 2022 Winter Olympics
Olympic ice hockey players of Japan
Seibu Princess Rabbits players